The Encyclopedia of New York City is a reference book on New York City, New York. Edited by Columbia University history professor Kenneth T. Jackson, the book was first published in 1995 by the New-York Historical Society and Yale University Press, with a second edition published in 2010.

Content
The encyclopedia covers the arts, architecture, demographics, education, environment, government and politics, media, popular culture, science, and transportation. It contains over 4,300 entries, including 680 illustrations, photographs, maps, charts and tables that combine statistics and public records.  Entries are written by experts in their respective fields and provide bibliographic references to more in-depth sources.

Second edition
The updated Encyclopedia of New York City, Second Edition was released on December 1, 2010, by Yale University Press. It contains 1,584 pages, increased from the first edition's 1,392 pages.

Awards
The first edition sold more than 75,000 copies and was in the top-five best-sellers in the century-long history of Yale University Press. Among its honors are:

 Recipient of the 1995 New York Society Library Award for best book about New York City
 It was named an outstanding reference book of 1995 by the American Library Association (Booklist) and by the New York Public Library
 It received an honorable mention for the 1996 Dartmouth Medal
 It was a selection of the History Book Club and the Reader's Subscription

See also

 History of New York City
 Lists of encyclopedias
 , to cite the first edition of this book in other articles
 , to cite the second edition of this book in other articles

Further reading

External links
 Kosner, Edward (December 4, 2010).  "A Toast to Gotham, Topped-Up" (book review). The Wall Street Journal. Retrieved August 15, 2013.

1995 non-fiction books
2010 non-fiction books
New York City
Books about New York City
English-language books
History of New York City
New York City, The Encyclopedia of
Yale University Press books
20th-century encyclopedias
21st-century encyclopedias